The Armenian language has two standardized forms: Western Armenian and Eastern Armenian. Before the Armenian genocide and other significant demographic changes that affected the Armenians, several dozen Armenian dialects existed in the areas historically populated by them.

Classification by Hrachia Acharian

Classification des dialectes arméniens (Classification of Armenian dialects) is a 1909 book by the Armenian linguist Hrachia Acharian, published in Paris. It is Acharian's translation into French of his original work Hay Barbaṙagitutʿiwn ("Armenian Dialectology") that was later published as a book in 1911 in Moscow and New Nakhichevan. The French translation lacks the dialectal examples.

Acharian surveyed the Armenian dialects in what is now Turkey, Armenia, Georgia, Iran, Azerbaijan and other countries settled by Armenians.

Unlike the traditional division of Armenian into two dialect groups (Western Armenian and Eastern Armenian), he divided Armenian into three main dialect groups based on the present and imperfect indicative particles that were used. He called as the -owm (-ում) dialects, -gë (-կը) dialects, and -el (-ել) dialects.

After the Armenian genocide, linguists Gevorg Jahukyan, Jos Weitenberg, Bert Vaux and Hrach Martirosyan have extended the understanding of Armenian dialects.

Map

List

-owm dialects

-el dialects

-gë dialects

Sources

 
Dialectology